or  is a hamlet in Narvik Municipality in Nordland county, Norway. It is located by the Rombaken fjord, just north of the Rombak Bridge. Hergot Chapel is located on the south side of the hamlet.

Road 7575 from Narvik crosses Hergot, and links to E10 between Lofoten in the west and Luleå, Sweden in the east.

References

Narvik
Villages in Nordland
Populated places of Arctic Norway